A Small Circle of Friends is a Germs tribute album, released in 1996.

Details
After the last track, there is a minute of silence before a sixteen-minute-long reprise of the song performed by Hovercraft begins. Just over a minute passes before a spoken word recording by Drew Blood, titled "Mohawk Redemption" is heard.

Track listing 
All tracks written by Darby Crash and Pat Smear except where noted.
 NOFX – "Forming" (Darby Crash) – 0:54
 Free Kitten – "Sex Boy" – 2:28
 The Melvins – "Lexicon Devil" – 1:40
 Hole (as "The Holez" w/ Pat Smear) – "Circle One" (Darby Crash) – 2:56
 D Generation – "No God" – 2:04
 Mike Watt & J Mascis – "What We Do is Secret" – 0:43
 Ruined Eye – "Land of Treason" – 3:09
 The Posies – "Richie Dagger's Crime" – 2:57
 O-Matic – "Strange Notes" – 1:58
 White Flag – "Manimal" – 2:07
 that dog. – "We Must Bleed" – 1:39
 Flea – "Media Blitz" – 1:58
 Sator – "The Other Newest One" – 2:58
 The Wrens – "Let's Pretend" – 2:44
 Matthew Sweet – "Dragon Lady" – 3:03
 Gumball – "Caught in My Eye" (Darby Crash) – 3:11
 Meat Puppets – "Not All Right" – 4:02
 Puzzled Panthers – "Now I Hear the Laughter" (Darby Crash/Lorna Doom) – 3:19
 L7 – "Lion's Share" – 2:43
 Monkeywrench – "Shutdown" – 3:04/Hovercraft – "Shutdown Reprise" – 16:00/Drew Blood – "Mohawk Redemption" – 0:39

Personnel
Produced by White Flag's Bill Bartell
Project Coordinated by Garvey Rich
Legal by Fred Davis

References

Tribute albums
1996 compilation albums
Punk rock compilation albums
Alternative rock compilation albums